Let It Snow is a 2020 horror-thriller film directed by Stanislav Kapralov. The film was written by Kapralov and Omri Rose, and stars Ivanna Saknho, Alex Hafner, and Tinatin Dalakishvili.

It was released on September 22, 2020 by Grindstone Entertainment Group.

Plot
Separated from her boyfriend, after sneaking onto a restricted slope, Mia, a free riding snowboarder, must survive not only against nature but also the masked snowmobile rider in black who's out for her blood.

Cast 
 Ivanna Sakhno as Mia
 Alex Hafner as Max
 Tinatin Dalakishvili as Lali

Release 
The film was released on video-on-demand on September 22, 2020 by Grindstone Entertainment Group.

Critical reception 
About the film, the Bloody Disgusting website remarked, "Most everything about Let It Snow is under-cooked, from the relationship between Mia and Max [its protagonists] to the larger mythology that the two find themselves tangled in."

References

External links 
 
 

2020 films
2020 horror thriller films
Horror thriller films from Georgia (country)
Ukrainian horror thriller films
2020s English-language films
English-language Ukrainian films
English-language films from Georgia (country)